Reese Stadium  is a multi-purpose stadium located on the campus of Yale University in New Haven, Connecticut. It is home to the Yale Bulldogs soccer and lacrosse teams. Reese Stadium is also the home of the Elm City Express professional soccer team.

The stadium seats 3,000 people and opened in 1981.  It is named for the Reese family who donated money for the project.  During the 1995 Special Olympics World Summer Games, it hosted the soccer matches.

References

External links
 

Sports venues completed in 1981
Sports venues in New Haven, Connecticut
Yale University buildings
College lacrosse venues in the United States
College soccer venues in the United States
Multi-purpose stadiums in the United States
Lacrosse venues in Connecticut
Soccer venues in Connecticut
National Premier Soccer League stadiums
1981 establishments in Connecticut